The Field Elm cultivar Ulmus minor Microphylla Purpurea was first described by C. de Vos, Handboek, 203, 1887.

Description
C. de Vos described the tree as differing only slightly from Ulmus campestris 'Microphylla Rubra'.

Cultivation
No specimens are known to survive.

References

Field elm cultivar
Ulmus articles missing images
Ulmus
Missing elm cultivars